Novaya Derevnya is a rural locality (a settlement) in Starooskolsky District, Belgorod Oblast, Russia. The population was 35 as of 2010. There is 1 street.

Geography 
Novaya Derevnya is located 29 km south of Stary Oskol (the district's administrative centre) by road. Prioskolye is the nearest rural locality.

References 

Rural localities in Starooskolsky District